"Thieves" is a song by American industrial metal band Ministry. It was released as the opening track from the band's fourth studio album, The Mind Is a Terrible Thing to Taste (1989), as well as the B-side from its single, "Burning Inside". The song's lyrics deal mainly with political corruption. The song includes dialogue samples from R. Lee Ermey's drill instructor character in Full Metal Jacket. Ministry's version was featured in the 1992 science fiction film Freejack, also in the 2009 video game Brütal Legend.

Overview 
The chorus of "Thieves" is influenced by "Mr. Suit" by the English band Wire.

The song is based on a harmonic stasis. It features the extensive use of E minor chord. 118 out of 138 measures of the song are based on the same E minor chord, while the rest are F minor chords. Al Jourgensen sings only the G note, while the song "shifts gears rhythmically" through its sections and quadruples its tempo.

Tom Moon, the author of 1,000 Recordings to Hear Before You Die, wrote, "At the two minute mark of "Thieves" and several times later in the song, Ministry's pulse is bolstered by what sounds like a whirring pneumatic drill. It's not a gimmick—it almost functions as a solo guitar, adding punctuation."

Personnel

Ministry 
 Al Jourgensen – vocals, guitars, programming, production
 Paul Barker – bass, programming, production

Additional personnel 
 William Rieflin – drums, programming
 Joe Kelly – backing vocals

Limp Bizkit cover 

American rap rock band Limp Bizkit covered parts of this song during Woodstock 99  as well as releasing their cover version of "Thieves" as a single via Twitter on November 1, 2013 for free download. Limp Bizkit performed it throughout many of the band's live sets since 1997, but the band did not release a studio version until 2013. Limp Bizkit's version does not include the samples that are on Ministry's version.

Personnel

Limp Bizkit 
 Wes Borland – guitars
 Fred Durst – vocals
 John Otto – drums
 Sam Rivers – bass

Footnotes

References 

1989 songs
2013 singles
Ministry (band) songs
Limp Bizkit songs
Cash Money Records singles
Sire Records singles
Warner Records singles
Protest songs
Songs about crime
Songs written by Al Jourgensen
Songs written by Paul Barker